The 2011–12 UIC Flames men's basketball team represented the University of Illinois at Chicago in the 2011–12 NCAA Division I men's basketball season. Their head coach was Howard Moore, serving his third year. The Flames played their home games at the UIC Pavilion and were members of the Horizon League. They finished the season 18–16, 7–9 in Horizon League play to finish in a tie for fifth place. They lost in the quarterfinals of the Horizon League tournament to Green Bay. They were invited to the 2013 CIT where they defeated Chicago State in the first round before losing in the second round to Northern Iowa.

Roster

Schedule

|-
!colspan=9| Exhibition

|-
!colspan=9| Regular season

|-
!colspan=9|2013 Horizon League tournament

|-
!colspan=9| 2013 CIT

References

UIC Flames
UIC Flames men's basketball seasons
UIC
2012 in sports in Illinois
2013 in sports in Illinois